Owghaz Kohneh (also Romanized as Owghāz Kohneh; also known as Kohneh Owghāz, Kohneh Aghāz, and Owghāz) is a village in Sivkanlu Rural District, in the Central District of Shirvan County, North Khorasan Province, Iran. At the 2006 census, its population was 634, in 173 families.

References 

Populated places in Shirvan County